George R. Edwards (1890 – June 10, 1972) was an American football, basketball, and golf coach and college athletics administrator.  He was the fourth head football coach at Kansas Wesleyan University in Salina, Kansas, serving for two seasons, in 1914 and again in 1917, and compiling a record of 4–11.  He was the head basketball coach at the University of Missouri from 1926 to 1946. He coached Missouri to a 181–172 record, winning three Big Six Conference championships and one NCAA tournament appearance.  He also served as Missouri's athletic director from 1943 to 1945.  Edwards grew up in Palmyra, Missouri.  He died on June 10, 1972, at the age of 81, Columbia, Missouri.  He was inducted into the Missouri Athletics Hall of Fame in 1991.

Head coaching record

College basketball

References

External links
 

1890 births
1972 deaths
Basketball coaches from Missouri
Basketball players from Kansas City, Missouri
College golf coaches in the United States
Guards (basketball)
High school basketball coaches in the United States
Kansas Wesleyan Coyotes football coaches
Kansas Wesleyan Coyotes men's basketball coaches
Missouri Tigers athletic directors
Missouri Tigers men's basketball coaches
Missouri Tigers men's basketball players
People from Marion County, Missouri
Sportspeople from Kansas City, Missouri
American men's basketball players